Cebeci İnönü Stadium is a multi-purpose stadium in Ankara, Turkey. It is currently used mostly for football matches and was the home stadium of Hacettepespor. The stadium holds 15,000 people and was built in 1967. It was named after the Turkish statesman İsmet İnönü. It was demolished in 2022.

References

External links
Venue information

Football venues in Turkey
Sports venues in Ankara
Sports venues completed in 1967
Multi-purpose stadiums in Turkey
İsmet İnönü
Hacettepe S.K.
Demolished buildings and structures in Turkey
Sports venues demolished in 2022